Erendira may refer to:

 Princess Erendira who led the Purépecha uprising against the Spanish
 The Incredible and Sad Tale of Innocent Eréndira and Her Heartless Grandmother, a novella by Gabriel García Márquez
 Eréndira (film), 1983 film based on the above
 Eréndira (film), 2006 film based on Princess Erendira
 Eréndira (album), by British jazz quartet First House
 Ejido Eréndira, small community in Baja California, Mexico
 Erendira (spider), genus of spider family Corinnidae